Mercy College of Ohio is a private Roman Catholic nursing school in Toledo and Youngstown, Ohio. It was founded as the Mercy School of Nursing in 1918 by the Sisters of Mercy.  The name was changed in August 2011 from Mercy College of Northwest Ohio to its current name. Mercy College is accredited by the Higher Learning Commission.

In September 2018, Mercy College and Bowling Green State University announced the start of a two-to-three-year process under which the college and its degree programs will become part of the university. In 2019 they instead chose to pursue a strategic partnership.

References

External links
Official website

Educational institutions established in 1917
Education in Toledo, Ohio
Buildings and structures in Toledo, Ohio
Sisters of Mercy colleges and universities
Catholic universities and colleges in Ohio
Roman Catholic Diocese of Toledo
1917 establishments in Ohio